The "rights of Englishmen" are the traditional rights of English subjects and later English-speaking subjects of the British Crown. In the 18th century, some of the colonists who objected to British rule in the thirteen British North American colonies that would become the first United States argued that their traditional rights as Englishmen were being violated. The colonists wanted and expected the rights that they (or their forebears) had previously enjoyed in England: a local, representative government, with regards to judicial matters (some colonists were being sent back to England for trials) and particularly with regards to taxation. Belief in these rights subsequently became a widely accepted justification for the American Revolution.

The American colonies had since the 17th century been fertile ground for liberalism within the center of European political discourse. However, as the ratification of the Declaration of Independence approached, the issue among the colonists of which particular rights were significant became divisive. George Mason, one of the Founding Fathers of the United States, stated that "We claim nothing but the liberty and privileges of Englishmen in the same degree, as if we had continued among our brethren in Great Britain."

Historical background 

In the tradition of Whig history, Judge William Blackstone called them "The absolute rights of every Englishman". He described the Fundamental Laws of England in his influential Commentaries on the Laws of England (1765), in which he explained how they had been established slowly over centuries of English history. They were certain basic rights that all subjects of the English monarch were understood to be entitled to, such as those expressed in Magna Carta since 1215, the Petition of Right in 1628, the Habeas Corpus Act 1679 and the Bill of Rights 1689.

In a legal case that came to be known as Calvin's Case, or the Case of the Postnati, the Law Lords decided in 1608 that Scotsmen born after King James I united Scotland and England (the postnati) had all the rights of Englishmen. This decision would have a subsequent effect on the concept of the "rights of Englishmen" in British America.

Legacy in United States law
Owing to its inclusion in the standard legal treatises of the 19th century, Calvin's Case was well known in the early judicial history of the United States. Consideration of the case by the United States Supreme Court and by state courts transformed it into a rule regarding American citizenship and solidified the concept of jus soli – the right by which nationality or citizenship can be recognised to any individual born in the territory of the related state – as the primary determining factor controlling the acquisition of citizenship by birth.

The Supreme Court Justice Joseph P. Bradley asserted that the "rights of Englishmen" were a foundation of American law in his dissenting opinion on the Slaughter-House Cases, the first Supreme Court interpretation of the Fourteenth Amendment to the United States Constitution, in 1873.

See also
 Civil and political rights
 Civil liberties in the United Kingdom
 First Charter of Virginia
 Natural and legal rights
 Parliament in the Making
 Roman citizenship
 English Bill of Rights

Notes

References

Citations

 
 
 
 
 
 
 
  
 

Rights
Constitutional law
English law
Social philosophy
Political history of England
Human rights in England
History of English colonialism